= Open data in Iran =

Iranian government of Islamic Republic has developed Open dataset/datasheet catalog system part of its Electronic "Data governance حکمرانی داده - Open data ecosystem" government program. Transparency system of Iranian Information Technology Organization portal has data regarding government funding, financial transparency documents, government auction bids data, businesses data, address books, and other data with the aim of discovering government corruption.

== Sites ==
- Data.gov.ir
- shafaf.ito.gov.ir
